Calliotropis babylonia is a species of sea snail, a marine gastropod mollusk in the family Eucyclidae.

Description
It can grow to be 6mm.

Distribution
This marine species occurs off Réunion.

References

 Vilvens C. (2007) New records and new species of Calliotropis from Indo-Pacific. Novapex 8 (Hors Série 5): 1–72.

External links

babylonia
Gastropods described in 2006